James McKinstry (born 3 July 1979 in Glasgow) is a Scottish former footballer, who notably played for Clydebank and Partick Thistle.

McKinstry was a defender who could play anywhere at the back as well as in midfield, and has a vast wealth of experience in the Scottish Football League, having played for Clydebank, Partick Thistle, Dumbarton and Ayr United, before moving to Stair Park to join Stranraer in the summer of 2007. He then turned out for the reformed Clydebank as a trialist, before signing with Petershill and then Vale of Clyde in the junior grade including an appearance in goal for the Vale as well as a testimonial against a Celtic XI in which he managed to miss a penalty during a 6-0 defeat.

External links 

Scottish footballers
1979 births
Footballers from Glasgow
Clydebank F.C. (1965) players
Partick Thistle F.C. players
Dumbarton F.C. players
Ayr United F.C. players
Stranraer F.C. players
Petershill F.C. players
Scottish Football League players
Scottish Premier League players
Association football defenders
Living people
Scottish Junior Football Association players
Scottish schoolteachers

 he is a vet mean